Judge Lane may refer to:

Arthur Stephen Lane (1910–1997), judge of the United States District Court for the District of New Jersey
Donald Edward Lane (1909–1979), associate judge of the United States Court of Customs and Patent Appeals
George Washington Lane (1806–1863), judge of the United States District Courts for the Northern, Middle, and Southern Districts of Alabama

See also
Geoffrey Lane, Baron Lane (1918–2005), Lord Chief Justice of England